Hadi Kiashar (also Romanized as Hādī Kīāshar; also known as Hadi Kiasar, Hādī Kīyā Shahr, and Haji Shir Kia) is a village in Machian Rural District, Kelachay District, Rudsar County, Gilan Province, Iran. At the 2006 census, its population was 749, in 221 families.

References 

Populated places in Rudsar County